The Tale of Despereaux is a 2008 computer-animated adventure fantasy film directed by Sam Fell and Rob Stevenhagen (in his feature directorial debut). It is based on the 2003 novel of the same name by Kate DiCamillo. The film is narrated by Sigourney Weaver and stars Matthew Broderick, Emma Watson, Robbie Coltrane, Dustin Hoffman, Richard Jenkins, Kevin Kline, Frank Langella, William H. Macy, James Nesbitt, Tony Hale, Christopher Lloyd, Tracey Ullman, Ciarán Hinds, and Stanley Tucci. Animation was provided by Framestore Animation.

The film was released in the United States by Universal Pictures on December 19, 2008. It is the second theatrically-released computer-animated film distributed by Universal Pictures, following The Pirates Who Don't Do Anything: A VeggieTales Movie. The Tale of Desperaux grossed $86.9 million against a $60 million budget and received generally mixed reviews: many critics praised the film for its animation, voice acting, and the title character, but criticism for its story.

Plot
A sailor named Pietro and his rat-companion Roscuro dock in the French kingdom of Dor—famous around the world for its delicious soups—during the "Royal Soup Day." The chief cook, Chef Andre, makes good soup due to Boldo, a magical genie who emerges from his pot and who is made entirely of food. Roscuro sneaks into the royal banquet-hall and falls into the Queen's soup, giving her such a fright that she has a heart-attack and dies. The entire hall erupts into panic and the guards pursue Roscuro. He attempts to flee the castle but sees Pietro's ship has sailed away. He narrowly escapes being killed as he falls  through a sewer drain which leads to the castle dungeons. He is found in the dungeons and taken in by Botticelli Remorso, the leader of the large rat population. Distraught over his wife's death, the King forbids the consumption all things related to soup and declares rats "illegal." Without its soup, Dor becomes impoverished and dreary. Andre is banned from making soup and Boldo stops appearing. The King's daughter—Princess Pea—despairs over the sad state of the kingdom and how her father's grief-based reclusive behavior shuts her—and the world—out.

In a mouse village within an abandoned kitchen storage room, Despereaux is born into the Tilling family. As he grows up, it is clear he is different from other mice: he is not timid—but rather is brave and curious—unnerving other mice around him. In an effort to teach him to be a "proper mouse," his brother Furlough takes him to the royal library to show him how to chew books, but Despereaux is more interested in reading them. He becomes fascinated by books about daring knights and trapped princesses. One day, Despereaux encounters and converses with Princess Pea. He promises to finish the story about a trapped princess and tell her how it ends. Upon discovering Despereaux has violated mouse law by talking to a human, his parents Lester and Antoinette turn him over to the mouse council to avoid blame.

The council banishes Despereaux to the dungeons, where he meets and tells the princess story to the jailor, Gregory, who stops listening and leaves Despereaux alone. Despereaux is captured by the rats and thrown into their arena with a cat. As Despereaux is about to be eaten, Roscuro saves his life by asking Botticelli to give Despereaux to him to eat. Having been unable to adjust to being a sewer rat, Roscuro is desperate to hear about the outside world. The two become friends, as every day Despereaux tells him the stories and of the princess and her sadness. Wishing to make amends for all the trouble he's caused, Roscuro sneaks into Pea's room and tries to apologize to her, but she lashes out at him, and he's pursued by guards once again. Hurt by this, Roscuro vows revenge. He enlists the help of Miggery "Mig" Sow, Pea's young, hard-of-hearing maid who longs to be a princess herself, by convincing her she can take Pea's place if she kidnaps her. After Mig drags Pea to the dungeons, Roscuro double-crosses her and locks her in a cell.

Meanwhile, Despereaux discovers the princess is in danger and he tries to tell the King who is too despondent to hear him. Despereaux tries to get help elsewhere; he tries to enlist his family, but they are afraid by his presence (thinking he is a ghost); he rings the town's bell to prove his survival. Andre, having had enough of the law, gets back to making soup, which brings the enchanted smell back to the kingdom and brings back Boldo. Despereaux tries to get help from Andre and Boldo, but only Boldo agrees and takes him back to the dungeons. On route, they are attacked by rats; Boldo sacrifices himself to allow Despereaux to reach the arena.

In the arena, Roscuro sees the apologetic sincerity in Pea's eyes and regrets his actions, but an enraged Botticelli signals the rats to eat Pea. Despereaux releases the cat to chase some of the rats away, and fights the others off as sunlight flows into the rat town. Despereaux is captured by Botticelli, but Roscuro saves him by reflecting the light at Botticelli, sending him falling into the arena. With the combined effort from Despereaux, Roscuro and Pea, Botticelli is trapped in a cage with the cat.

In the aftermath, Roscuro apologizes to Pea once again and she apologizes too; Mig is reunited with Gregory, who turns out to be her long-lost father, and they go back to their farm together.  Meanwhile, the King overcomes his grief and allows soup and rats back in the kingdom; the mice finally stop cowering (much to the mouse council's disdain); Roscuro returns to his life at sea with the light and gentle breeze, and Despereaux himself departs on a journey to see the world.

Voice cast
 Matthew Broderick as Despereaux Tilling, the brave but nonconforming mouse who does not run from danger as a mouse should.
 Dustin Hoffman as Chiaroscuro "Roscuro", the rat who currently lives at sea, and formerly worked for Botticelli
 Emma Watson as Princess Pea, the human princess who befriends Despereaux
 Tracey Ullman as Miggery "Mig" Sow, Princess Pea's servant girl
 Ciarán Hinds as Botticelli Remorso, the evil leader of the rat world
 Robbie Coltrane as Gregory, the jailer and Mig's father
 William H. Macy as Lester Tilling, Despereaux's father
 Tony Hale as Furlough Tilling, Despereaux's older brother
 Kevin Kline as Chef Andre, the cook.
 Stanley Tucci as Boldo, Andre's Arcimboldo-like soup genie and friend
 Frank Langella as The Mayor of the mouse world
 Frances Conroy as Antoinette Tilling, Despereaux's mother
 Richard Jenkins as The Principal at Despereaux's school
 Christopher Lloyd as Hovis, the threadmaster in the mouse world
 Charles Shaughnessy as Pietro, the sailor who Roscuro accompanied to Dor
 Sam Fell as Ned, Mig's uncle and Smudge, a rat
 Patricia Cullen as Queen Rosemary, Princess Pea's mother
 Jane Karen as Louise
 Bronson Pinchot as The Town Crier
 McNally Sagal as the teacher at Despereaux's school
 James Nesbitt as King Philip of Dor, Princess Pea's father (uncredited)
 Sigourney Weaver as The Narrator

Production
The film's production was marred by disagreements and malpractice, or accusations thereof, between the French, British and North American staff involved. Sylvain Chomet was employed by Gary Ross and Allison Thomas as director early on, before the film was approved for funding by Relativity Media, with pre-production (including character design, the first drafts of the screenplay written by Will McRobb and Chris Viscardi, and the addition of the original character of Boldo) taking place at his studio Django Films in Edinburgh. Chomet came up against creative and ethical differences with the producers and was eventually fired from the project and thrown out of the studio space allocated to the film. Mike Johnson was hired to replace Chomet as director, before the role eventually went to Sam Fell and Rob Stevenhagen.

Music

The score to The Tale of Despereaux was composed by William Ross, who recorded his score with the Hollywood Studio Symphony at the Sony Scoring Stage.

Release

The Tale of Despereaux was theatrically released on December 19, 2008, by Relativity Media.

Home media
The film was released on DVD and Blu-ray on April 7, 2009. One Blu-ray release also includes a standard-definition DVD of the film in addition to the Blu-ray Disc. The film brought in a revenue of $25,531,805 in the US DVD sales market.

Reception

Critical response 

The website's consensus reads, "Despite its striking visuals, The Tale of Despereaux as a story feels familiar and unimaginative." Metacritic gives the film a weighted average score of 53 out of 100 based on reviews from 25 critics, indicating "mixed or average reviews". Audiences polled by CinemaScore gave the film an average grade of "B" on an A+ to F scale.

Roger Ebert of Chicago Sun-Times awarded three stars and wrote in his review that "The Tale of Despereaux is one of the most beautifully drawn animated films I've seen," but also wrote, "I am not quite so thrilled by the story."
Christy Lemire of Associated Press was more critical, writing that the film "feels obvious, preachy and heavy-handed."

Box office 
The film opened at the third position in the United States, behind Seven Pounds and Yes Man, with $10,507,000 in 3,104 theaters with an $3,385 average; on Monday, Tuesday, and Wednesday, the film was in second. The film closed in March 2009 after grossing $50 million domestically. The film grossed an additional $37 million overseas for a total of $87 million.

Awards

Video game

A video game based on the film published by Brash Entertainment was released on December 2, 2008 for the PlayStation 2, Wii, and Nintendo DS, and on December 16, 2008 for Microsoft Windows. An Xbox 360 version was originally announced, but it was cancelled. While the PlayStation 2, Wii, and Microsoft Windows versions were an action-adventure game, the Nintendo DS version was a 2.5D side-scrolling platformer.

References

External links

 Official website
 
 
 

2008 films
2000s children's fantasy films
Films based on American novels
Films based on fantasy novels
Animated films based on novels
Relativity Media animated films
Films set in castles
Animated films set in France
Animated films set on islands
American computer-animated films
American animated fantasy films
British computer-animated films
British animated fantasy films
2008 directorial debut films
2008 computer-animated films
Animated films about mice
2000s American animated films
Films directed by Sam Fell
Films with screenplays by Gary Ross
Films scored by William Ross
American children's animated fantasy films
Animated films about friendship
Animated films about rats
Relativity Media films
2000s English-language films
2000s British films